Mikhail Afanasyevich Shakhov (20 November 1931 – 8 August 2018) was a Soviet bantamweight freestyle wrestler.

Biography 
He was born in Saratov in 1931. Shakhov lost his father during World War II in 1942. He was raised in Saratov Oblast, Russia, and took up wrestling in Kiev, Ukraine, while serving with the Soviet Army there. He started serving in Internal Troops of the Ministry of Internal Affairs of the USSR in Kiev in 1951. Then he started training in Sambo and in 1954 became the champion of the USSR. He competed at the 1956 and 1960 Olympics and won a bronze medal in 1956. He stayed in Kiev for most of his life. Shakhov won the Soviet bantamweight title in 1956, 1960 and 1961, placing third in 1957. His favorite technique was kata guruma. After retiring from competitions he worked as a wrestling coach in Ukraine and Poland. His trainees include Taras Danko and Valeriy Andriytsev.

In 1957 Shakhov married Anastasiya, a woman from Saratov Oblast five years his junior; she died of cancer in 2004. The couple had a daughter Larisa, who was married to the basketball player Alexander Belostenny and lived in Germany.

Death 
He died in 2018 at the age of 87.

References

1931 births
2018 deaths
Olympic wrestlers of the Soviet Union
Wrestlers at the 1956 Summer Olympics
Wrestlers at the 1960 Summer Olympics
Ukrainian male sport wrestlers
Olympic bronze medalists for the Soviet Union
Olympic medalists in wrestling
Medalists at the 1956 Summer Olympics
Sportspeople from Saratov Oblast